Böhmerland, or Čechie as it was known domestically, was a Czechoslovak motorcycle manufacturer from 1924 until World War II. Almost all aspects of this distinctive motorcycle were designed by Albin Liebisch, including the extremely long, all-welded tube-frame chassis, the built-up leading-link front forks, and solid cast aluminum wheels, which were an industry first, not widely adopted until the 1970s. The Böhmerland was produced in several wheelbases; a two-seat Sport, a 3-seat Touren, and a 4-seat Langtouren. An experimental machine built for the military seated four soldiers, and used two gearboxes, with the rear operated by a passenger, giving 9 ratios.  
The Langtouren model is notable for having the longest wheelbase of any production motorcycle, . Around 775 total machines emerged from Liebisch's factory in Schönlinde and later in Kunratice, Sudetenland, Czechoslovakia. The factory employed 20 workers, assembling parts manufactured locally to Leibisch's specification.

Literature
 Jan Němec (2010): Legendární motocykl Čechie, Grada, Praha 
 Miroslav Gomola (2000): Motocykly Čechie-Böhmerland, AGM CZ, Brno 
 Ivan Margolius (2020): Modernism on Two Wheels, The Automobile, May 2020, UK, s. 52 - 55. ISNN 0955-1328

Notes

External links
 Unusual Motorcycles

Motorcycle manufacturers of the Czech Republic
Motorcycles introduced in the 1920s